Retama Park is a class 1 pari-mutuel horse racetrack located in Selma, Texas, United States, that opened in 1995. Live quarter horse races meet June to August and live thoroughbred races meet September to November. Simulcast racing is shown year round. The track is owned by the Retama Development Corporation (a quasi-governmental entity formed by the City of Selma) and managed by Penn Entertainment.

History
The Retama Development Corporation was formed in the early 1990s to issue bonds to finance the track's construction and to act on behalf of Selma to oversee the racetrack's construction and operations. Retama Park held it first race on April 7, 1995, 1 and 1/2 years behind schedule.

Financial problems
Retama Park has never turned a profit. The RDC filed for Chapter 9 bankruptcy protection in March 1996. Call Now, Inc., a publicly-traded long-distance phone company bought over 90% of the bonds issued for construction of the track and allowed the track to emerge from bankruptcy and continue operation. Call Now failed in 2011, and the track was in danger of foreclosure from Call Now's creditors but was granted a forbearance instead. In 2013, Pinnacle Entertainment  purchased a 75.5% equity stake in Retama Partners, Ltd., the owner of the racing license for Retama Park, for $22.8 million, averting another bankruptcy filing for the RDC. Pinnacle also took over operations of the track under a management agreement with the RDC.

In 2018, Penn National Gaming (now Penn Entertainment) acquired Pinnacle and assumed management of the track.

References

External links 

Horse racing venues in Texas
Buildings and structures in Bexar County, Texas
1995 establishments in Texas